Halone is a genus of moths in the subfamily Arctiinae from southern Asia and Australia. The genus was erected by Francis Walker in 1854.

Species
Halone consolatrix (Rosenstock, 1899) (Australia)
Halone coryphoea Hampson, 1914 (Australia)
Halone diffusifascia (Swinhoe, 1896) (Assam)
Halone ebaea Hampson, 1914 (Australia)
Halone epiopsis Turner, 1940 (Australia)
Halone flavescens (Hampson, 1898) (India)
Halone flavinigra Hampson 1907 (India)
Halone interspersa (T. P. Lucas, 1890) (Australia)
Halone ophiodes (Meyrick, 1886) (Australia)
Halone prosenes Turner, 1940 (Australia)
Halone pteridaula (Turner, 1922) (Australia)
Halone sejuncta (Felder & Rogenhofer, 1875) (Australia)
Halone servilis (Meyrick, 1886) (Australia)
Halone sinuata (Wallengren, 1860) (Australia)
Halone sobria Walker, 1854 (Australia)

References

Lithosiini
Moth genera